KK TFT, also known as TFT Skopje, is a basketball club based in Skopje, North Macedonia. They play in the Macedonian First League from the season 2020–21.

History
 
KK TFT was founded in 2018 in Skopje by a group of enthusiasts from Taftalidže settlement of the Skopje's Karpoš Municipality. In the first two seasons, the club took part in Macedonian Second League. In the season 2018–19, the team finished at fourth place in the regular season and were eliminated in the Round of 16. Next season, they were placed at first place when the season was suspended because of the COVID-19 pandemic and the Basketball Federation has decided to promote them to Macedonian First League. From season 2020 the club entered Balkan Basketball League (BIBL).

In the 2021–22 season, TFT entered the qualifying rounds of the FIBA Europe Cup, marking the club's debut in Europe.
FIBA CHAMPIONS LEAGUE
After the successful entering to the FIBA Europe Cup previous season  TFT Skopje was the organizer of the pool A qualifiers for the Champions League. The venue was Trajkovski Arena in Skopje . The Host TFT Skopje was playing against top European teams:  Leicester Riders,Voluntari,Niners Chemnitz ,Tofaş and Fribourg Olympic for the spot in the Champions league in the season 2022/23.
The Venue of the tournament 
The BTSC – TRAJKOVSKI ARENA,  Skopje.

Home Ground of TFT Skopje
TFT Basket plays matches at the SRC Kale, a multi-functional indoor sports arena. Kale means Fortress Citadel, named after the Skopje's Fortress, located right next to the hall. The capacity of the hall is 4.000 spectators.

Honours
Macedonia Cup  
: 2022
Macedonian Second League (East) 
 : 2020
BIBL League Seasons 
 2021:(4-10)6th
 2022:(5-9) 8th

European competitions

Current roster

Current roster

Depth chart

References

External links
 Eurobasket.com KK TFT Page

Basketball teams in North Macedonia
Basketball teams established in 2018
Sport in Skopje